ESR may refer to:

Organizations
 Earlham School of Religion, at Earlham College in Richmond, Indiana, US
 E.S.R., Inc., a former American toy manufacturer
 ESR Rīga, a Soviet Latvian football club, active from 1966 to 1991
 ESR Technology, a UK company
 e-Shang Redwood, an Asia focused Real Estate services and investment firm
 Ethnikó Simvúlio Radhiotileórasis, the Greek National Council for Radio and Television
 European Society of Radiology
 Institute of Environmental Science and Research, a New Zealand scientific institute

Science
 EISCAT Svalbard radar, UHF-band radar at Longyearbyen, Norway
 Electron spin resonance, a technique used in chemical spectroscopy to identify unpaired electrons and free radicals
 Electron spin resonance dating, a dating technique used in archaeology and geology
 Erythrocyte sedimentation rate, the rate at which red blood cells sediment
 Estrogen receptor, a group of proteins
 European Sociological Review, sociological scientific journal

Technology
 Electro-slag remelting, an alloy remelting and refining process
 Electronic Staff Record, a human resources and payroll system of the UK National Health Service
 Equivalent series resistance, the resistive parts of the impedance of certain electrical components
 Emergency sun reacquisition, an attitude control mode of the Solar and Heliospheric Observatory
 Extended-support release, software that receives official security updates for an extended period of time
 M2010 Enhanced Sniper Rifle, a sniper rifle used by the US Army

Transportation
 East Somerset Railway, a heritage railway in the UK
 Eastar Jet (ICAO code), a Korean airline
 Ricardo García Posada Airport (IATA code), Chile
 Emergency speed restriction, a UK railway speed reduction

Other uses
 Eric S. Raymond (born 1957), American computer programmer, author and open source software advocate
 Emile Smith Rowe, English professional footballer for Arsenal FC
 Effort Sharing Regulation a European regulation designed to allocate the Green House Gases reduction objectives among European Union Member States